
Gmina Przywidz is a rural gmina (administrative district) in Gdańsk County, Pomeranian Voivodeship, in northern Poland.

Villages
Gmina Przywidz contains the villages and settlements of Blizny, Borowina, Czarna Huta, Częstocin, Gromadzin, Huta Dolna, Huta Górna, Jodłowno, Katarynki, Kierzkowo, Klonowo Dolne, Klonowo Górne, Kozia Góra, Łąkie, Majdany, Marszewo, Marszewska Góra, Marszewska Kolonia, Michalin, Miłowo, Nowa Wieś Przywidzka, Olszanka, Piekło Dolne, Piekło Górne, Pomlewo, Przywidz, Roztoka, Stara Huta, Sucha Huta, Szklana Góra, Trzepowo, Ząbrsko Dolne and Ząbrsko Górne.

Neighbouring gminas
Gmina Przywidz is bordered by the gminas of Kolbudy, Nowa Karczma, Skarszewy, Somonino, Trąbki Wielkie and Żukowo.

References
Polish official population figures 2006

Przywidz
Gdańsk County